Juha Pekka Hakola (born 27 October 1987) is a Finnish professional footballer who plays as a winger for Grankulla IFK in the Kakkonen.

Club career 
Hakola played two seasons for FC Flora Tallinn. Hakola was named the Meistriliiga Footballer of the Year for his performances for Flora in 2007. In 2007, he also went on trial with RCD Espanyol. On 30 December it was announced that Hakola signed a 1.5-year contract with Heracles Almelo in the Dutch Eredivisie. He made his league debut for the new team on 17 January 2009 against ADO Den Haag. Hakola scored his first goal in Eredivisie from a freekick on 19 April 2009 against NAC Breda.

On 25 June 2010 Hakola signed a 2+1 year contract with Willem II. Next summer however, following Willem's relegation from Eredivisie, Hakola left the club and signed a two-year contract with Ferencváros in Hungary.

In 2013, he had a brief stint in his home country, playing for KuPS.  Next year, Hakola signed a contract with Aris Limassol.

Hakola signed with FC Honka for the 2019 season. The deal was announced already on 15 November 2018.

In June 2020, Hakola signed with Grankulla IFK.

International career 
Hakola was nominated for the Finland national football team on 5 February 2009 for a friendly international match with Portugal, he entered as a substitute late in the game. He had been a member of the under 21 national team, and also has one cap for the under 23 team.

Honours
Ferencváros
Hungarian League Cup (1): 2012–13

Individual
 Meistriliiga Footballer of the Season: 2007

References

External links 
 
 
 
 

1987 births
Living people
Footballers from Espoo
Finnish footballers
Association football midfielders
Finland international footballers
Finland under-21 international footballers
Helsingin Jalkapalloklubi players
FC Flora players
Heracles Almelo players
Willem II (football club) players
Ferencvárosi TC footballers
Aris Limassol FC players
Eredivisie players
Nemzeti Bajnokság I players
Kuopion Palloseura players
Vaasan Palloseura players
FC Honka players
Veikkausliiga players
Cypriot First Division players
Finnish expatriate footballers
Expatriate footballers in Estonia
Expatriate footballers in the Netherlands
Expatriate footballers in Hungary
Finnish expatriate sportspeople in Estonia
Finnish expatriate sportspeople in the Netherlands
Finnish expatriate sportspeople in Hungary
Klubi 04 players
Grankulla IFK players
Kakkonen players
Meistriliiga players